Ashton-under-Lyne is a town in the Tameside, Greater Manchester, England.  The town and the countryside to the north contain 51 listed buildings that are recorded in the National Heritage List for England.  Of these, one is listed at Grade I, the highest of the three grades, seven are at Grade II*, the middle grade, and the others are at Grade II, the lowest grade.

The growth of the town came with the arrival of canals and with the growth of the cotton industry in the later 18th century.  Before this, the earliest listed buildings are houses, farmhouses, and a church with items in its churchyard.  Buildings associated with the canals include an aqueduct and a bridge.  Listed buildings from the 19th century include more churches and houses, civic buildings, schools, cotton mills that were later used for other purposes, railway viaducts, and a commemorative tower.  Listed buildings from the 20th century include war memorials, a theatre, and a telephone kiosk.


Key

Buildings

References

Citations

Sources

Lists of listed buildings in Greater Manchester